This is a list of singles that charted in the top ten of the Billboard Hot 100 during 2001.

Ja Rule and Destiny's Child each had four top-ten hits in 2001, tying them for the most top-ten hits during the year.

Top-ten singles

Key
 – indicates single's top 10 entry was also its Hot 100 debut

2000 peaks

2002 peaks

See also
2001 in music
List of Hot 100 number-one singles of 2001 (U.S.)
Billboard Year-End Hot 100 singles of 2001

References

General sources

Joel Whitburn Presents the Billboard Hot 100 Charts: The 2000s
Additional information obtained can be verified within Billboard's online archive services and print editions of the magazine.

2001
United States Hot 100 Top 10